The following is a list of Registered Historic Places in Kent County, Michigan.



Current listings

|}

Former listing

|}

See also

 List of Michigan State Historic Sites in Kent County, Michigan
 List of National Historic Landmarks in Michigan
 National Register of Historic Places listings in Michigan
 Listings in neighboring counties: Allegan, Barry, Ionia, Montcalm, Muskegon, Newaygo, Ottawa

References

Kent County
Kent County, Michigan
Buildings and structures in Kent County, Michigan